Abdirahman Aw Ali Farrah, nicknamed Tolwaa is a Somali politician who was the third Vice President of Somaliland from May 1995 to February 1997.

History 
Abdirahman was a high-ranking SNM colonel and one of few non-Isaaq members of the organization, belonging to the Jibril Yonis sub-division of the Gadabuursi Dir clan.

Abdirahman contributed to the Somaliland peace process in the aftermath of the Somaliland War of Independence. In January 1991, in one of the final acts of the war, the 99th division of the SNM led by Colonel Ibrahim Koodbuur had pursued government forces that fled from Hargeisa to the town of Dilla. After a ferocious battle, the SNM captured the town and then continued into the main Gadabursi town of Borama. However, because the SNM leadership believed that the Gadabursi wished to seek peace, they withdrew their units after a mere 24 hours to allow discussions to take place without the shadow of occupation. This was eased by the fact that Abdirahman was present.

The difficult situation in Borama was exacerbated by hunger and food shortages. When Abdirahman Aw Ali entered his hometown of Borama, the people saw the SNM forces as the best solution to the unbearable situation in the town. As part of alleviating the food shortage in Borama, Abdirahman Aw Ali, in collaboration with clan elders, ordered that the shopkeepers reopen their stores and sell their commodities at an affordable price. Before, they had closed in the hope of raising the prices of the dry rations.

Most locals in Borama were armed and ready to fight, including members of the pro-Barre Gadabursi militant group, the Somali Democratic Alliance (or SDA for short), armed Oromos, and several Gadabursi subclans. The confidence of the SNM however was rewarded when a brief initial meeting in mid-February in Tulli, just outside Borama, agreed that Gadabursi delegates would attend a larger peace conference in Berbera and then resume bilateral talks immediately after that meeting had finished, this time in Borama itself.

Abdirahman subsequently served as the vice president of Somaliland from May 1995 to February 1997, when he was succeeded by Dahir Riyale Kahin, a fellow Gadabuursi, who went on to become the third president of Somaliland.

References 

Living people
Gadabuursi
People from Awdal
Somalian politicians
Somaliland politicians
Vice presidents of Somaliland
Year of birth missing (living people)